α-Copaene synthase (EC 4.2.3.133) is an enzyme with systematic name (2E,6E)-farnesyl-diphosphate diphosphate-lyase (cyclizing, α-copaene-forming). This enzyme catalyses the following chemical reaction

 (2E,6E)-farnesyl diphosphate  (–)-α-copaene + diphosphate

This enzyme is isolated from Helianthus annuus (sunflower).

References

External links 
 

EC 4.2.3